The Dassault Falcon 2000 is a business jet produced by French Dassault Aviation, a member of its Falcon business jet line. Developed from the Falcon 900 trijet, the smaller twinjet has less range.

Development

The wing leading edge was modified and its inboard slats were removed.
It was introduced in 1995 for $17.85 million, while the 2022 Falcon 2000LXS lists for $35.1 million.

Variants

Re-engined variant certified in 2003 with Pratt & Whitney Canada PW308C turbofan engines,  each, offering a  range.

Falcon 2000EX EASy
Marketing designation for a 2000EX with changes to pressurisation and oxygen systems, certified in 2004, and Honeywell Primus Epic-based EASy avionics suite, including synthetic vision. Undertook steep approach trials at London City Airport on 18 March 2010, becoming the first Dassault twin-jet to visit apart from the much older, diminutive Dassault Falcon 10.

Falcon 2000DX
Updated model certified in 2007 and based on the 2000EX EASy with the same PW308C turbofans.

Falcon 2000LX

The same winglets are certified for the entire Falcon 2000 series as a retrofit kit.

Falcon 2000S
Variant which began testing in 2011 with short field characteristics. Landing distance has been reduced to 705 meters, opening up 50% more airports than other aircraft in this class. In 2021, its equipped price was $28.8M. It offers a  range.

Falcon 2000LXS
Replacement for the long-range 2000LX to be offered in 2014, adding the short-runway features of the 2000S. In 2021, its equipped price was $35.1M.

Falcon 2000 MSA
 Maritime Surveillance Aircraft version based on Falcon 2000 LXS. Six purchased by Japan Coast Guard with deliveries from 2019.

Falcon 2000 MRA

 Maritime Reconnaissance Aircraft (Maritime surveillance aircraft) version proposed to French Naval Aviation to replace its naval Falcon 50 Surmar and Falcon 200 Gardian. It has been selected by the Japan Coast Guard.

Operators

Civil operators
The aircraft is operated by private individuals, companies and executive charter operators. A number of companies also use the aircraft as part of fractional ownership programs.

Military and government operators

 Bulgarian Air Force
 28th Air Detachment

 Japan Coast Guard Six Falcon 2000 MSA ordered.

 Slovenian Air Force and Air Defence

 Republic of Korea Air Force 2 ELINT Falcon 2000s on order.

 French Air and Space Force 1 Falcon 2000S has been delivered to the Escadron de transport, d'entrainement et de calibration 65, based at Vélizy – Villacoublay Air Base.

 Royal Thai Police

Specifications (Falcon 2000LXS)

See also

References

External links

 Falcon 2000S Official Page
 
 
 

Falcon 2000
1990s French business aircraft
Low-wing aircraft
Twinjets
Cruciform tail aircraft
Aircraft first flown in 1993